My Mother Said I Never Should is a play in three acts written by Charlotte Keatley and first staged in Manchester in 1987. The play is about the relationships between mothers and daughters, and explores the themes of independence, growing up and secrets. It addresses the issues of teenage pregnancy, career prioritisation and single motherhood. It is also about how the different generations break free from their parents' traditions and culture.

The story explores the lives and relationships of four generations of women: Doris (born 1900), Margaret (born 1931), Jackie (born 1952) and Rosie (born 1971). Their loves, expectations, and choices are set against the huge social changes of the twentieth century. When the unmarried Jackie falls pregnant with Rosie, she is unable to cope and hands over the baby to her mother (Margaret), who then brings up Rosie as her own daughter. The play looks at the consequences of this secret and each woman's opinion on it.

The play has a minimalist set and is deliberately unrealistic. The scenes do not follow in chronological order, so in one scene Margaret will be a young child during the war being comforted by her mother Doris and in the next Jackie will be a child visiting her grandma Doris.

Plot

The play has a non-chronological and non-linear structure and moves between different places (Manchester, Oldham, and London) and time periods. It presents various episodes in the lives of the four female characters between the 1920s to 1987. It also features scenes set in "the wasteground", where the four characters play together as their child selves in their own contemporary costumes.

The play begins in the Wasteground, where the four girls play as contemporaries - Doris appears aged five, Rosie aged eight, and Jackie and Margaret aged nine. They show disgust for the idea of little girls being made of 'sugar and spice and all things nice' and then put forth the idea of 'killing their Mummy'. Jettisoning the younger Doris, they are wary of ingredients for their 'curse' being too real (such as harelip) or too fantastical; and then call upon the spirit of their Granny, fleeing as a figure moves upstage towards them. The figure is Doris, now an adult and singing to a racy George Formby song on the radio. Her daughter, Margaret, aged eight; surprises her by shouting 'knickers' from beneath the piano. Doris insists on being called 'Mother' rather than 'Mummy', and pushes Margaret to practice the piano rather than answering her inquisitive, lively child's questions about the war and whether her parents say their prayers. The next scene shows Doris as a grandmother with Jackie, Margaret's daughter; now affectionate and lenient, by contrast to her relationship with Margaret.

Roles

Productions 
My Mother Said I Never Should was written in 1985 and was first produced at the Contact Theatre in Manchester on 25 February 1987, directed by Brigid Larmour. A revised edition premiered at the Royal Court Theatre in a production directed by Michael Attenborough on 23 February 1989 and in a revival which premiered on 29 September 2009 at the Watford Palace Theatre, again directed by Brigid Larmour.

The play has frequently been revived internationally. It was for many years the most performed drama by a female playwright, until it was overtaken by The Vagina Monologues.

Awards and nominations 
Awards 

 1987: The Royal Court/George Devine Award 
 1987: The Manchester Evening News Theatre Award for Best New Play.

Nominations 

 1990: Laurence Olivier Most Promising Newcomer Award

References

1980s debut plays
1987 plays
British plays
Feminist plays